Jujeath Nagaowa (born August 5, 1987) is a Filipina mixed martial artist and boxer, who has fought for world titles for International Female Boxers Association and Women's International Boxing Association. As a mixed martial artist, she has competed for WSOF and ONE FC.

Early life and Career 
Jujeath Nagaowa was born in Baguio, Benguet, Philippines. Both of her parents were farmers and were separated during her early childhood. She was forced to become independent in her high school days when she lived at her aunts house. Her career started on physical fitness in losing weight by Muai Thai and Boxing, but she had never been interested in becoming an athlete. In 2006 an invitation of Muai Thai competition in Manila gave Naogawa some inspiration to become an athlete. Later on she chose Boxing as her ideal sport after the first time she won.

On December 19, 2015, Nagaowa will be fighting against Japanese Nao Ikeyama in Colombo, Sri Lanka, for the WBO female atomweight title.

Professional boxing record

Mixed martial arts record

|Win
|align=center|4–0
|Kannika Bangnara
|Submission (rear-naked choke)
|Combat FC 1: Inception
|
|align=center|1
|align=center|2:35
|Hainan, China
|
|-
|Win
|align=center|3–0
|Yuko Kiryu
|Decision (unanimous)
|WSOF GC 3
|
|align=center|3
|align=center|5:00
|Quezon City, Philippines
|
|-
|Win
|align=center|2–0
|Tharoth Sam
|TKO (Punches and Elbows)
|ONE FC 23: Warrior's Way
|
|align=center|2
|align=center|3:34
|Manila, Philippines
|
|-
|Win
|align=center|1–0
|Jeet Toshi
|TKO (Punches)
|ONE FC 15: Rise of Heroes
|
|align=center|2
|align=center|1:07
|Manila, Philippines
|

References

External links
 

1987 births
Filipino female mixed martial artists
Living people
Sportspeople from Baguio
Atomweight mixed martial artists
Mixed martial artists utilizing boxing
Mixed martial artists utilizing Muay Thai
World boxing champions
Filipino women boxers
Filipino Muay Thai practitioners
Female Muay Thai practitioners